The Red Fisher Show is a Canadian television series which appeared on CTV from 1968 to 1989. Its episodes featured host and American expatriate B. H. "Red" Fisher with different guests who would narrate footage of fishing or hunting expeditions in various regions of Canada and the United States. The show's TV set was dubbed "Scuttlebutt Lodge, the Tall Tale Capital of the World". The show was subject to parody, in the form of the also popular The Red Green Show, and SCTV's The Fishin' Musician with John Candy as host Gil Fisher.

The program was broadcast on weekends outside prime time, generally appearing Saturday afternoons.

Guests
Dates indicated are based on broadcasts on CFTO-TV Toronto.

Gordon "Red" Berenson, hockey player (3 July 1971)
Johnny Bower, hockey player
Bill Culluton, flycaster (17 July 1971)
Ben Hardesty, World Casting Champion (11 September 1971)
Alan Hale, Jr., actor
Stan Mikita, hockey player
Gordie Howe, hockey player
Ferguson Jenkins, baseball
Ben Johnson, actor
Roger Maris, baseball (10 July 1971)
Merlin Olsen, football player
Slim Pickens, actor
Eddie Shack, hockey player
Ted Williams, baseball player (11 March 1972)

See also
 B. H. Fisher

References

1968 Canadian television series debuts
1989 Canadian television series endings
CTV Television Network original programming
1960s Canadian documentary television series
1960s Canadian sports television series
1970s Canadian sports television series
1980s Canadian sports television series
1970s Canadian documentary television series
1980s Canadian documentary television series